Sarah Cowley may refer to:

 Sarah Cowley (athlete) (born 1984), New Zealand track and field athlete
 Sarah Cowley (nurse),  British district nurse and academic

See also 
 Sarah Crowley, Australian professional triathlete